The Weird Doll is a 2016 Chinese horror thriller film directed by Kwang Che Ching. It was released in China on February 25, 2016.

Plot

Cast
Li Yuhang 
Cheng Yuanyuan
Kong Wei

Reception
The film has grossed  at the Chinese box office.

References

Chinese horror thriller films
2016 horror films
2016 horror thriller films